Peter Harrison (June 14, 1716 – April 30, 1775) was a colonial American architect in New England who is credited with bringing the Palladian architectural movement to the colonies.

Early life and education
Born in York, England, Harrison immigrated to the colony of Rhode Island in 1740 with his brother Joseph Harrison. They initially established themselves as merchants and captains of their own trading vessels.

Having gained a stake, between 1743 and 1745, Harrison returned to England to receive formal training as an architect. He studied under the direction of an English lord (it is not known which one), among those who trained architects through private studio-schools. They used architectural pattern books, taught drafting and coloring skills, and conducted grand tours of Italy and Greece, where students could see classical structures firsthand. They were taught to become expert draftsmen. These private studio-schools drew from the works of such masters such as the 16th-century Italian Palladio and the classical Roman Vitruvius.

Career
Through his travels and education in Europe, Harrison acquired a substantial library of books related to classically inspired designs, and also had an opportunity to see the latest designs that were produced by architects of the Palladian movement. When he returned to New England, where he first settled in Newport, Rhode Island, he brought Palladianism with him. He designed notable buildings in Rhode Island and Massachusetts, and influenced many more.

Peter Harrison is now credited as the first professionally trained architect in America in the Palladian style. His known works in the British-American colonies are considered to be of the highest quality and the finest examples of Palladianism in his time.

Works 
More than 400 buildings in Europe, North and South America, Africa, and Asia have been attributed to Harrison, though only a few are supported with documentary evidence. Those listed here are his documented projects as identified by historian John Fitzhugh Millar in 2014.

 Steeple, Christ Church, Philadelphia, PA (1745)
 Fort George I, Goat Island, Newport, RI (1745, demolished)
 Leamington Farm, Newport, RI (1747, altered)
 Matthew Cozzens House, Middletown, RI (1748, demolished 1949)
 Redwood Library, Newport, RI (1748–49)
 Beavertail Lighthouse I, Jamestown, RI, (1749, burned)
 King's Chapel, Boston, MA (1749)
 John Still Winthrop House, New London, CT (1754, demolished)
 Beavertail Lighthouse II, Jamestown, RI, (1755, destroyed)
 Touro Synagogue, Newport, RI (1759)
 Christ Church, Cambridge MA (1759–60)
 Saint John’s Freemasons Hall, Newport, RI (1759)
 Steeple and enlargement, Trinity Church, Newport, RI (1762)
 Old Brick Market, Newport, RI (1762–72)
 Saint Paul’s Chapel, New York, NY (1766, recent identification)
 Old Dartmouth Hall, Dartmouth College, Hanover, NH (1769, burned 1904, reconstructed)
 Governor John Wentworth County House, Wolfeborough, NH (1769, demolished)
 Trinity Church, Brooklyn, CT (1771)

Later life 
Harrison married Elizabeth Pelham and later settled in New Haven, Connecticut. He was dedicated to Toryism and English culture. He was ruined by this affiliation during the turbulent years of the American Revolutionary War, when Tories were sometimes boycotted as local conditions turned. He died of a stroke at his home in New Haven in 1775. He is buried in an unmarked grave at the New Haven Green.

Soon after his death in 1775, his home was attacked by a mob of revolutionaries. They burned his library and all of his original drawings. This act of political violence destroyed the collection of one of the most erudite architects of the colonial period. It prevented the preparation of a catalogue of his designs for posterity.

Gallery

References

Further reading
 Carl Bridenbaugh, Peter Harrison: First American Architect (1949)

External links

 from a Digital Archive of American Architecture
 https://www.flickr.com/photos/herzogbr/3714177960/

1716 births
1775 deaths
People from York
Architects from Newport, Rhode Island
People of colonial Rhode Island
Loyalists in the American Revolution from Connecticut
English emigrants
Burials in Connecticut